is a Japanese politician of the Liberal Democratic Party, a member of the House of Representatives in the Diet (national legislature).

A native of Shinjuku, Tokyo and graduate of the University of Tokyo, Kihara joined the Ministry of Finance in 1993. In 1999, Kihara has sent to visit the United Kingdom to study its political system, and interviewed former Prime Minister Margaret Thatcher who encouraged him to enter politics. He was elected for the first time in 2005. , he is Parliamentary Vice-Minister for Foreign Affairs.

At the LDP, Kihara also served as Director of the Committee on Cabinet Standing, and as a member of the Committee on Financial Affairs.

Affiliated to the openly revisionist lobby Nippon Kaigi, which advocates a restoration of monarchy in the archipelago, Kihara was among the 225 MPs joining the 'one million people rally to protect the Imperial tradition' in March 2006.

Kihara is affiliated with Prime Minister Fumio Kishida, who called Kihara the person he most trusts while campaigning for him in 2021.

References

External links 
  in Japanese.

1970 births
Living people
People from Tokyo
University of Tokyo alumni
Alumni of the London School of Economics
Koizumi Children
Members of Nippon Kaigi
Members of the House of Representatives from Tokyo
Liberal Democratic Party (Japan) politicians